Jamia Farooqia is an Islamic seminary in Pakistan, having two branches, one located in the Shah Faisal Colony in Karachi, and the other in Hub Chowki.

Established in 1967 by Saleemullah Khan, an alumnus of Darul Uloom Deoband, the seminary has over 2300 students.

History
Jamia Farooqia was established in 1967 by Saleemullah Khan. The seminary has two branches, one located in the Shah Faisal Colony, and the other in Hub Chowki. The seminary was headed by Saleemullah Khan until his death on 15 January 2017. He was succeeded by his son Muhammad Adil Khan.

Nizamuddin Shamzai who taught in the seminary for twenty years, was assassinated on 30 May 2004.

Magazine
Al-Farooq is a monthly magazine published by the Jamia in four languages Urdu, Arabic, Sindhi and English.

Alumni
Alumni include:
 Nizamuddin Shamzai
 Muhammad Adil Khan
 Qari Hussain

References

Deobandi Islamic universities and colleges
Educational institutions established in 1967
1967 establishments in Pakistan
Islamic universities and colleges in Pakistan
Jamia Farooqia